Colgate Whitehead Darden Jr. (February 11, 1897 – June 9, 1981) was an American lawyer and Democratic politician aligned with the Byrd Organization who served as U.S. Representative from Virginia (1933–37, 1939–41), the 54th Governor of Virginia (1942–46), Chancellor of the College of William and Mary (1946–47) and the third President of the University of Virginia (1947–59). The Darden Graduate School of Business Administration of the University of Virginia was named for him.

Early life
Darden was born on Marle Hill, a farm in Southampton County, Virginia, near Franklin, to Katherine Lawrence (Pretlow) Darden (1870–1936) and Colgate Whitehead Darden (1867–1945). His ancestors had lived in Southampton County for generations, Darden's Tavern had figured in Nat Turner's Revolt.

Darden volunteered to serve in the French Army before the United States entered World War I and became an ambulance driver, although he returned in 1917 to recover and enlist in the United States Marine Corps. He was commissioned a lieutenant and became a fighter pilot during World War I. He later attended the University of Virginia, where he was a member of Phi Gamma Delta fraternity, and graduated in 1922 before going on to Columbia Law School (graduated 1923) and then Oxford University.

Career 
Admitted to the Virginia bar, Darden began his legal practice in Norfolk, Virginia. He became active in the local Democratic party and aligned with the Byrd Organization. In 1929, Darden won his first election, becoming one of Norfolk's four (part-time) representatives to the Virginia House of Delegates. He also won re-election and served alongside Daniel Coleman, Vivian L. Page and Wilson W. Vellines from 1930 to 1933, when Darden resigned because of his election to Congress. Ralph H. Daughton and Richard W. Ruffin replaced Darden and the deceased Vellines in the special election for the vacancies.

Congressional service 
In 1932, Darden won election as a Democrat in an At-large election to select Virginia's U.S. Representatives to the 73rd Congress. The Byrd Organization controlling the Virginia legislature had switched from an election by congressional districts to an at-large method that year in order to unseat Republican Menalcus Lankford, who represented the 2nd district, and thus Democrats swept all Virginia's congressional seats in that election. Darden won re-election two years later, this time representing the 2nd district in the 74th Congress, and served from March 4, 1933 – January 3, 1937. Norfolk port official and Portsmouth publisher Norman R. Hamilton unseated Darden in the Democratic primary in 1936, so he did not serve in the 75th Congress, but defeated Hamilton in the next Democratic primary and thus won re-election in 1938 and 1940 to the 76th and 77th Congresses. Thus he served from January 3, 1939 – March 1, 1941, when Darden resigned to run for Governor of Virginia.

While in Congress, as a Byrd Organization loyalist, Darden supported the Dies Committee (predecessor of the House Unamerican Activities committee) and opposed federal anti-lynching legislation in 1940 (though he supported Virginia legislation concerning the same crime). Darden also supported loans to European allies as early as 1939, before the United States entered World War II.

Electoral history 
1932; Darden was elected to Congress with the rest of the Democratic slate as an at-large member winning 8.24% of the vote in a 24-way race.
1934; Darden was re-elected defeating Republican Gerould M. Rumble, Socialist George Rohlsen, and Communist Herbert S. Carrington, winning 76.14% of the vote.
1938; Darden was re-elected defeating Independent Carl P. Spaeth, winning 87.7% of the vote.
1940; Darden was re-elected unopposed.

Governor of Virginia 

Darden was elected Governor of Virginia with 80.72% of the vote, defeating Republican Benjamin Muse, Communist Alice Burke, and Socialist M. Hilliard Bernstein.  Inaugurated on January 21, 1942, Darden served until January 16, 1946.
As governor, Darden reorganized Virginia's civil defense, reformed Virginia's penal system, and created a pension plan for state employees and teachers. He also eliminated the state debt (a core value of the Byrd organization) and created a surplus which was allocated to vocational schools, colleges, hospitals and other public services (including electrification of all Virginia educational institutions). However, Darden's record on race relations reflected Byrd organization values: blacks would receive financial help to study at Meharry Medical College in Tennessee (since Virginia medical schools remained only for whites) and he called to remove legislative obstacles to blacks serving on juries. Governor Darden also refused to overturn the firing of several black educators following the 1940 federal equal pay decision in Alston v School Board of Norfolk.

President of the University of Virginia 
Darden was elected president of the University of Virginia in 1947, despite public misgivings from some among the university faculty, who resented his lack of faculty experience, and some students feared that he planned to abolish the fraternity system at the university. The latter concern had its origin in Darden's actions as Governor of Virginia, where he recommended barring students at the College of William and Mary from living in fraternity or sorority houses on the grounds that it was "undemocratic" and placed undue financial burden on parents. While Darden did not impose similar restrictions at Virginia, he did attempt to implement other measures, such as a ban on first year rushing.

While Darden favored admitting African Americans to professional and graduate schools after the Supreme Court mandated such, he otherwise shared the "separate but equal" stance of many white Southerners of the pre-Brown v. Board of Education (1954) era. In 1950 Darden advocated that public schools remain, in his words, racially "segregated," but "first-rate." In that year, following federal litigation, Gregory Swanson became the first black student admitted to the University of Virginia School of Law. Darden also testified as a witness favoring segregation in Davis v. County School Board of Prince Edward County, one of the companion cases to Brown, and Judge Albert Bryan, in the 3-judge decision upholding the unequal schools which the Supreme Court reversed, specifically cited Darden's testimony as influential. In August 1954, Darden also addressed a Ruritan gathering in Southampton and warned about the white race being only a tiny fraction of the population.

At Virginia, Darden was responsible for erection of the student union building, named Newcomb Hall for his predecessor John Lloyd Newcomb; the establishment of the Judiciary Committee (which handled student misconduct that did not rise to the level of an honor offense); the creation of the graduate school of business administration (named in his memory) and significant improvements to faculty salaries. Upon his retirement, he was presented with the Thomas Jefferson Award and the Raven Award.

President Dwight D. Eisenhower appointed Darden as a U.S. delegate to the United Nations General Assembly in 1955, as he broke with the Byrd Organization's Massive Resistance policy.

Personal life 
Darden died in 1981 at his home in Norfolk, Virginia. He was buried in the family plot with his parents. In addition to his wife, he was survived by his younger brother Joshua Pretlow Darden, who had served as Norfolk's mayor (1949–50). Darden is memorialized with a historic marker at the site of his birth.

Darden enjoyed a close friendship with Tidewater resident Barham Gary, whose sister, writer Myra Page, referred to Darden by the nickname "Clukey." His nephew (Joshua Darden) went on to be the rector at UVA, as well as head of the board. Joshua has two daughters; Audrey and Holley Darden.

References

External links

Colgate Whitehead Darden entry at the National Governors Association
Colgate Whitehead Darden Jr. entry at The Political Graveyard

1897 births
1981 deaths
United States Marine Corps personnel of World War I
Chancellors of the College of William & Mary
Columbia Law School alumni
Democratic Party governors of Virginia
Democratic Party members of the Virginia House of Delegates
People from Southampton County, Virginia
Presidents of the University of Virginia
Recipients of the Croix de Guerre (France)
United States Marine Corps officers
University of Virginia alumni
Democratic Party members of the United States House of Representatives from Virginia
Virginia lawyers
20th-century American politicians
Old Right (United States)